David Giles (born 27 November 1964) was an Australian competitive sailor and Olympic medalist. He won a bronze medal in the Star class at the 1996 Summer Olympics in Atlanta, together with Colin Beashel. He competed with Colin Beashel in the Star class sailing at every Olympic regatta from Barcelona 1992 through to Athens 2004. He was an Australian Institute of Sport scholarship holder.

References

1964 births
Sportsmen from New South Wales
Sailors from Sydney
Australian male sailors (sport)
Sailors at the 1992 Summer Olympics – Star
Sailors at the 1996 Summer Olympics – Star
Sailors at the 2004 Summer Olympics – Star
Olympic sailors of Australia
Olympic bronze medalists for Australia
Olympic medalists in sailing
Australian Institute of Sport sailors
Living people
Star class world champions
Sailors at the 2000 Summer Olympics – Star
World champions in sailing for Australia
Medalists at the 1996 Summer Olympics
20th-century Australian people